Milena Chlumová (born 1 June 1946) is a Czech former cross-country skier. She competed in two events at the 1972 Winter Olympics.

Cross-country skiing results

Olympic Games

World Championships

References

External links
 

1946 births
Living people
Czech female cross-country skiers
Olympic cross-country skiers of Czechoslovakia
Cross-country skiers at the 1972 Winter Olympics
People from Vrchlabí
Sportspeople from the Hradec Králové Region